The 2008–09 figure skating season began on July 1, 2008, and ended on June 30, 2009. During this season, elite skaters competed on the Championship level at the 2009 European, Four Continents, World Junior, and World Championships. They also competed in elite competitions such as the Grand Prix and Junior Grand Prix series.

Season notes 
As this was a pre-Olympic season, skaters qualified entries to the 2010 Winter Olympic Games at the 2009 World Championships.

Age eligibility 
Skaters competing on the junior level were required to be at least 13 but not 19 – or 21 for male pair skaters and ice dancers – before July 1, 2008. Those who had turned 14 were eligible for the senior Grand Prix series and senior B internationals. Those who turned 15 before July 1, 2008 were also eligible for the senior World, European, and Four Continents Championships.

Music

Competitions 
Key

Records
During the season, the following world records were set:

ISU Champions
During the season, the following skaters won ISU Championships.

Season's best scores
The following are all the season's best scores set over the season.

Men 
Men's season's best scores on April 18, 2009.

Ladies 
Ladies' season's best scores on April 18, 2009.

Pairs 
Pair skating season's best scores on April 18, 2009.

Ice dance 
Ice dance season's best scores on April 18, 2009.

World standings

Season-end standings (top 30)

Men's singles

Ladies' singles

Pairs

Ice dance

References

 Progression of highest scores: Ladies overall (Archived 2009-08-14)
 Progression of highest scores: Ladies short program

Seasons in figure skating